Julia Walczyk (born 28 October 1997) is a Polish fencer.

In 2015, she won the bronze medal in the women's team foil event at the Junior World Fencing Championships held in Tashkent, Uzbekistan. In the same year, she also represented Poland at the 2015 European Games held in Baku, Azerbaijan. She competed in the women's foil event and she was eliminated by Natalia Sheppard of Great Britain.

In 2017, she won the gold medal in the junior women's team foil event at the Junior and Cadet World Fencing Championships in Plovdiv, Bulgaria. In the same year, she also won the bronze medal in the women's team foil event at the 2017 Summer Universiade held in Taipei, Taiwan. She also competed in the women's individual foil event. In 2019, she won one of the bronze medals in the women's foil event at the Military World Games held in Wuhan, China. She also won the bronze medal in the women's team event, alongside Bogna Jóźwiak, Hanna Łyczbińska and Martyna Synoradzka.

She competed at the 2022 European Fencing Championships held in Antalya, Turkey. She also competed at the 2022 World Fencing Championships held in Cairo, Egypt.

References

External links 
 

Living people
1997 births
Place of birth missing (living people)
Polish foil fencers
Polish female fencers
Fencers at the 2015 European Games
European Games competitors for Poland
Universiade medalists in fencing
Universiade bronze medalists for Poland
Medalists at the 2017 Summer Universiade
21st-century Polish women